Civitella del Lago is a village in the Italian region of Umbria, administratively a frazione of the commune of Baschi. It is located just above lake Corbara, an artificial lake on the course of the river Tiber. The inhabitants during the winter are about 300 growing in summer to more than 700. There are sights of the Tiber valley and the province of Viterbo, and on clear days it is possible to see as far as the hills above the Tyrrhenian Sea.

Many foreigners, above all from Britain, USA and the Netherlands found their buen retiros in the surroundings of this village, which is easily reachable by motorway from Rome and Florence as it is just halfway from them. Only 20 minutes by car divide the village from the famous Umbrian towns of Orvieto and Todi.

Frazioni of the Province of Terni